Obiora is a given name and a surname. 

Notable people with the given name include:
Obiora Chinedu Okafor, Canadian lawyer
Obiora Odita (born 1983), Nigerian  footballer
Obiora Udechukwu (born 1946), Nigerian painter and poet

Notable people with the surname include:
Anoure Obiora (born 1986), Nigerian footballer
Arinze Obiora (born 1985), Nigerian high jumper
Michael Obiora (born 1986), British actor and writer
Nwankwo Obiora (born 1991), Nigerian footballer